Pat Trivigno (March 13, 1922 – January 30, 2013) was an American painter and educator. He taught at Tulane University for 43 years. His paintings can be seen at the Brooklyn Museum, New York, the Guggenheim Museum, New York, the Ogden Museum of Southern Art and the New Orleans Museum of Art.

Life
Trivigno was born in 1922 in New York City to Italian immigrants. He graduated from Columbia University and Temple University's Tyler School of Art.

Trivigno taught at Tulane University from 1947 to 1989. As a painter, he was influenced by Cubism and Mexican art, and his artwork was exhibited in the United States and Europe. For example, the Alexandria Museum of Art in Alexandria, Louisiana exhibited 60 paintings by Trivigno in 1995. His artwork was acquired by the Ogden Museum of Southern Art and the New Orleans Museum of Art.

Trivigno married Eva LaMothe. He died on January 30, 2013, at age 90.

Further reading

References

1922 births
2013 deaths
American people of Italian descent
People from New York City
Columbia University alumni
Temple University Tyler School of Art alumni
Tulane University faculty
Painters from Louisiana
20th-century American painters